The CFM International LEAP ("Leading Edge Aviation Propulsion") is a high-bypass turbofan engine produced by CFM International, a 50–50 joint venture between American GE Aviation and French Safran Aircraft Engines (formerly Snecma).  It is the successor of the CFM56 and competes with the Pratt & Whitney PW1000G to power narrow-body aircraft.

Design
The LEAP's basic architecture includes a scaled-down version of Safran's low pressure turbine used on the GEnx engine. The fan has flexible blades manufactured by a resin transfer molding process, which are designed to untwist as the fan's rotational speed increases. While the LEAP is designed to operate at a higher pressure than the CFM56 (which is partly why it is more efficient), CFM plans to set the operating pressure lower than the maximum to maximize the engine's service life and reliability. Currently proposed for the LEAP is a greater use of composite materials, a blisk fan in the compressor, a second-generation Twin Annular Pre-mixing Swirler (TAPS II) combustor, and a bypass ratio around 10–11:1.

The high-pressure (HP) compressor operates at up to a 22:1 compression ratio, which is roughly double the corresponding value for the CFM56's HP compressor.

CFM uses ceramic matrix composites (CMC) to build the turbine shrouds. These technological advances are projected to produce 16% lower fuel consumption. Reliability is also supported by use of an eductor-based oil cooling system similar to that of the GEnx, featuring coolers mounted on the inner lining of the fan duct.  According to Aviation Week's article, "The eductor device produces a venturi effect, which ensures a positive pressure to keep oil in the lower internal sump." The engine has some of the first FAA-approved 3D-printed components.

Development

The LEAP ("Leading Edge Aviation Propulsion") incorporates technologies that CFM developed as part of the LEAP56 technology acquisition program, which CFM launched in 2005. The engine was officially launched as LEAP-X on 13 July 2008. It is intended to be a successor to the CFM56-5B and CFM56-7B.

In 2009, COMAC selected the LEAP engine for the C919. The aircraft was due to begin testing in 2016.
In total, 28 test engines will be used by CFM to achieve engine certification, and 32 others will be used by Airbus, Boeing and COMAC for aircraft certification and test programs. The first engine entering the test program reached and sustained  of thrust, required to satisfy the highest rating for the Airbus A321neo. The same engine ultimately reached  of thrust in test runs.

CFM carried out the first test flight, of a LEAP-1C, in Victorville, California, with the engine mounted on the company's Boeing 747 flying testbed aircraft, on October 6, 2014.  The -1C version features a thrust reverser equipped with a one piece O-ring replacing a 2 piece door. The thrust reverser is deployed by the O-ring sliding aft, reducing the drag that was induced by the older design and improving efficiency. In April 2015, it was reported that the LEAP-1B was suffering up to a 5% shortfall on its promised reduction in fuel consumption.
It obtained its 180-minute ETOPS approval from the U.S. Federal Aviation Administration and the European Aviation Safety Agency on June 19, 2017.

Orders

On July 20, 2011, American Airlines announced that it planned to purchase 100 Boeing 737 aircraft featuring the LEAP-1B engine. The project was approved by Boeing on August 30, 2011, as the Boeing 737 MAX. Southwest Airlines is the launch customer of the 737 MAX with a firm order of 150 aircraft.

The list price of a LEAP-1A is USD million, and  USD million for a LEAP-1B.

CFM International offers its support for the engine, and signed a 15-year Rate per Flight Hour agreement with Loong Air for 20 LEAP-1A at  U.S $333 million, or $ per engine per day, in contrast with U.S. $138 million for 17 CFM International CFM56 over 12 years or $ per engine per day. As a number of A320neo engine for ANA group of Japan was also ordered in 2014, there is a possibility to select the LEAP engine.

In 2016 CFM booked 1,801 orders, LEAP backlog is at more than 12,200 for more than $170 billion U.S. at list price. In early 2018, the backlog was at 14,500, with a 59% share of the A320neo market for decided customers as it has an 18 percentage point advantage in utilization rate over the Pratt & Whitney PW1000G.

By July 2018, the LEAP had an eight-year backlog with 16,300 sales. More LEAPs were produced in the five years to 2018 than CFM56s in 25 years.
It is the second-most ordered jet engine behind the 44-year-old CFM56, which achieved 35,500 orders. In July 2018 its A320neo selected-engine market share was 58.6%, with one-third yet to select, the CFM56 have a 60% share of the A320ceo market.

In 2020, GE Aviation lost 1,900 orders worth $13.9 billion ($M each), reducing the backlog value to $259 billion, while more than 1,000 Boeing 737 Max orders were cancelled among the Boeing 737 MAX groundings and the impact of the COVID-19 pandemic on aviation.

Production

In 2016, the engine was introduced in August on the Airbus A320neo with Pegasus Airlines and CFM delivered 77 LEAP. With the 737 MAX introduction, CFM delivered 257 LEAPs in the first three quarters of 2017, including 110 in the third: 49 to Airbus and 61 to Boeing, and targets 450 in the year. CFM was to produce 1,200 engines in 2018, 1,900 in 2019, and 2,100 in 2020. This is compared to the 1,700 CFM56 produced in 2016.

To cope with the demand, CFM is duplicating supply sources on 80% of parts and even subdivide assembly sites, already shared between GE and Safran. GE assembles its production in Lafayette, Indiana, US in addition to its previous Durham, North Carolina, US facility. As more than 75% of the engine comes from suppliers, critical parts suppliers pass “run-rate stress tests” lasting two to 12 weeks. Pratt & Whitney acknowledges a production ramp-up bottleneck on its rival PW1100G geared turbofan including a critical shortage of the unique aluminium-titanium fan blade, hitting the Airbus A320neo and the Bombardier CSeries deliveries. Safran assembles its production in Villaroche, France, Safran and GE each assemble half of the annual volume. Mecachrome plan to produce 120,000–130,000 LEAP turbine blades in 2018 up from 50,000 in 2017.

In mid-June 2018, deliveries remained four to five weeks behind schedule down from six, and should catch up in the fourth quarter as the quality variation of castings and forgings improves. The production has no single manufacturing choke point by selecting multiple suppliers for every critical part.
From 460 in 2017, 1,100 LEAPs should be built in 2018, along 1,050 CFM56s as it encounter unexpected sales, to pass the record production of 1,900 engines in 2017. It will stay over 2,000 engines per year as 1,800 LEAPs should be produced in 2019 while CFM56 production will drop, then 2,000 in 2020. In 2018, 1,118 engines were delivered.

Over the first half of 2019, CFM revenues were up by 23% to €5.9 billion with 1,119 engine deliveries; declining sales of CFM56 (258 sold), more than offsetted by LEAP (861 sold). Recurring operating income rose by 34% to €1.2 billion, but was reduced by €107 million ($118 million) due to the negative margins and initial costs of LEAP production, before a positive contribution expected in the second half. Revenues should grow by 15% in 2019 but free cash flow depends on the return to service of the grounded 737 MAX.

In 2019, LEAP production rose to 1,736 engines, orders and commitments reached 1,968 amid the 737 MAX groundings, compared with 3,211 for 2018, for a stable backlog of 15,614 (compared to 15,620). CFM expects to produce 1,400 LEAP engines in 2020, including an average of 10 weekly LEAP-1Bs for the Boeing 737 Max. By March 2022, CFM intended to output 2,000 engines in 2023, up from 845 deliveries in 2021.

Operations 

The troubled introduction of the PW1100G on the A320neo has motivated customers to choose LEAP engines. LEAP market share rose from 55% to 60% in 2016, but orders for 1,523 aircraft (%) had not specified which engine would be chosen. From January through early August 2017, 39 PW1100G engines versus 396 CFM LEAP engines were chosen. As an example of PW1100G reliability issues, 9% of LEAP-powered A320neos were out of service for at least one week in July 2017, compared with 46% of those using the PW1100G.

The Boeing 737 MAX LEAP-1B started revenue service in May 2017 with Malindo Air with 8 hours of daily operation, while the A320neo LEAP-1A surpassed 10 hours per day by July. Safran discovered a production quality defect on LEAP-1B low-pressure turbine disks during assembly for possibly 30 engines and CFM is working to minimize flight-test and customer-delivery disruptions.

In early October 2017, an exhaust gas temperature shift was noticed during a flight and a CMC shroud coating in the  turbine was seen flaking off in a borescope inspection, creating a leaking gap: eight in-service engines are seeing their coating replaced. Safran provisioned €50 million ($58 million) to trouble-shoot in-service engines, including potentially LEAP-1Bs. Forty LEAP-1A were replaced and the part should be replaced in over 500 in-service engines, while shipments are four weeks behind schedule. Deliveries with the permanent CMC environmental-barrier coating fix began in June.

On March 26, 2019, due to the Boeing 737 MAX groundings, Southwest Airlines flight 8701 (737 MAX 8) took off from Orlando International Airport for a ferry flight to storage without passengers, but soon after problems with one of the engines caused an emergency landing at the same airport. Southwest then inspected 12 LEAP engines and two other airlines also inspected their engines. CFM recommended replacing the fuel nozzles more often due to coking, a carbon buildup.

By December 2021, CFM claimed a 72% share of the narrowbody market.

Applications

Specifications

See also

References

External links

 CFM LEAP page 
 CFM Unveils New LEAP-X Engine
 CFM ready to advance LEAP-X schedule; opens way for 737RE
 A320 re-engine decision in 2010
 Plane makers switch to cleaner engines

High-bypass turbofan engines
2010s turbofan engines
General Electric aircraft engines
Snecma aircraft engines